Caldwell County is a county located in the U.S. state of Texas. As of the 2020 census, its population was 45,883. Its county seat is Lockhart. The county was founded in 1848 and named after Mathew Caldwell, a ranger captain who fought in the Battle of Plum Creek against the Comanches and against Santa Anna's armies during the Texas Revolution. Caldwell was also a signer of the Texas Declaration of Independence.

Caldwell County is part of the  metropolitan area.

History 
Around 8000 BC, Paleo-Indians hunter-gatherers inhabited the area, and later Tonkawa, Karankawa and Comanche peoples became the first identified inhabitants. Caldwell County, of Green DeWitt's petition for a land grant to establish a colony in Texas, was approved by the Mexican government in 1825.

In 1839, Edmund Bellinger became the first settler of Prairie Lea, the county's oldest town. Sam Houston named the town for his future wife Margaret Lea Houston.  The legislature formed Caldwell County from Bastrop and Gonzales Counties in March 1845. Lockhart was named as the county seat.

By 1860, the county population was 2,871, with 1,610 slaves. The community of Fentress was established, originally as Riverside, but later changed to honor the town's first physician, James Fentress. The next year, the county voted 434–188 in favor of secession from the Union. Several hundred men from Caldwell County served in the Confederate States Army.

In the 1870s, St. John Colony was established by former slaves. The town of Luling was established in 1874 . John and James Merriwether and Leonidas Hardeman built a gristmill and a sawmill, later known as Zedler's Mills.

The Missouri, Kansas, and Texas completed its track between Lockhart and San Marcos in 1887. Two years later, the San Antonio and Aransas Pass Railway connected Lockhart and Luling to Shiner. By 1892, the Missouri, Kansas and Texas had laid track from Lockhart east to Smithville.

From 1880 to 1900, tenant farming accounted for nearly half of all the county's farming and as much as 75% of the 3,149 farms. The Southwest Texas Sacred Harp Singing Convention was established in 1902 in McMahan.

On August 9, 1922, Edgar B. Davis discovered the Luling Oilfield.  The Luling Foundation was established  in 1927 by Davis to teach diversity in agriculture and improve the lives of farm and ranch families.

The Lockhart State Park opened to the public in 1948. In 1953, Luling established its annual Watermelon Thump celebration.

Geography 

Major highways 
  Interstate 10
  U.S. Highway 90
  U.S. Highway 183
  State Highway 80
  State Highway 130

Adjacent counties 
 Travis County (north)
 Bastrop County (northeast)
 Fayette County (southeast)
 Gonzales County (south)
 Guadalupe County (southwest)
 Hays County (northwest)

Demographics 

Note: the US Census treats Hispanic/Latino as an ethnic category. This table excludes Latinos from the racial categories and assigns them to a separate category. Hispanics/Latinos can be of any race.

As of the 2010 United States census, 38,066 people were living in the county. 75.8% were White, 6.8% African American, 0.9% Asian, 0.8% Native American, 13.1% of some other race, and 2.5% of two or more races; 47.1% were Hispanic or Latino (of any race).

As of the census of 2000,  32,194 people, 10,816 households, and 8,079 families were living in the county.  The population density was 59 people per square mile (23/km2).  The 11,901 housing units had an average density of 22 per square mile (8/km2).  The racial makeup of the county was 70.13% White, 8.50% African American, 0.61% Native American, 0.34% Asian, 17.96% from other races, and 2.74% from two or more races.  About 40.4% of the population were Hispanics or Latinos of any race.

Of the 10,816 households,  37.0% had children under 18 living with them, 56.0% were married couples living together, 13.3% had a female householder with no husband present, and 25.3% were not families. About 21.2% of all households were made up of individuals, and 9.4% had someone living alone who was 65 or older.  The average household size was 2.82, and the average family size was 3.28.

A Williams Institute analysis of 2010 census data found about 5.8 same-sex couples per 1,000 households lived in the county.

In the county, the age distribution was 28.3% under 18, 8.5% from 18 to 24, 29.8% from 25 to 44, 20.8% from 45 to 64, and 12.5% who were 65 or older.  The median age was 34 years. For every 100 females, there were 97.5 males.  For every 100 females aged 18 and over, there were 92.7 males.

The median income for a household in the county was $36,573, and for a family was $41,300. Males had a median income of $29,295 versus $21,595 for females. The per capita income for the county was $15,099.  About 10.40% of families and 13.10% of the population were below the poverty line, including 15.10% of those under age 18 and 15.40% of those age 65 or over.

Communities

Cities 
 Lockhart (county seat)
 Luling (small part in Guadalupe County)
 Martindale
 Mustang Ridge (mostly in Travis County and a small part in Bastrop County)
 Niederwald (mostly in Hays County)
 San Marcos (mostly in Hays County and a small part in Guadalupe and Comal Counties)
 Uhland (mostly in Hays County)

Unincorporated communities 
 Brownsboro
 Dale
 Delhi
 Elm Grove
 Fentress
 Joliet
 Lytton Springs
 Maxwell
 McMahan
 McNeil
 Mendoza
 Pettytown (partly in Bastrop County)
 Prairie Lea
 Reedville
 Saint John Colony
 Seawillow
 Soda Springs
 Stairtown
 Taylorsville
 Tilmon

Ghost town 
 Polonia

Politics

County government

Caldwell County elected officials

Education
School districts:
 Gonzales Independent School District
 Hays Consolidated Independent School District
 Lockhart Independent School District
 Luling Independent School District
 Prairie Lea Independent School District
 San Marcos Consolidated Independent School District
 Waelder Independent School District

Austin Community College is the designated community college for the county.

See also 

 List of museums in Central Texas
 National Register of Historic Places listings in Caldwell County, Texas
 Recorded Texas Historic Landmarks in Caldwell County

References

External links 
 County of Caldwell
 Caldwell County in Handbook of Texas Online at the University of Texas.

 
1848 establishments in Texas
Populated places established in 1848
Majority-minority counties in Texas